Poliesportiu d'Andorra, also known as Poliesportiu de Govern, is an indoor sporting arena located in Andorra la Vella, Andorra.

History
Opened in 1991, the initial capacity of the arena was 3,000 people. It was temporarily expanded to 5,000 with additional seats from 1993 to 1996 when BC Andorra played in Liga ACB. It also hosts various sporting events such as team handball and futsal matches.

In 2011, the Poliesportiu d'Andorra hosted the Final Eight of the roller hockey's European League.

In 2014, after the second promotion of BC Andorra to the Spanish top basketball league, the National Government decided to expand the arena to 5,000 seats.

League attendances
This is a list of games attendances of BC Andorra at Poliesportiu d'Andorra since its expansion in 2014.

References

External links
The arena at Andorra Tourism website

Handball venues in Andorra
Sport in Andorra la Vella
Indoor arenas in Andorra
Basketball venues in Andorra
Volleyball venues in Andorra